Nocardioides kongjuensis is a Gram-positive bacterium from the genus Nocardioides which has been isolated from soil from Gongju, South Korea. Nocardioides kongjuensis has the ability to degrade N-acyl homoserine lactone.

References

Further reading

External links
Type strain of Nocardioides kongjuensis at BacDive -  the Bacterial Diversity Metadatabase	

kongjuensis
Bacteria described in 2006